Li Yang (born 1959) is a Chinese writer-director. Though often grouped with the so-called Sixth Generation of Chinese filmmakers, he is in fact closer in age to the Fifth Generation and in interviews has denied membership with either group, claiming that such labels are only artificial differentiations.

Born in Xi'an, China in 1959, Li studied at the Beijing Broadcasting Institute from 1985 to 1987, after which he moved to Germany. There he made several documentary films and spent some time acting on German television before eventually enrolling and graduating from the Academy of Media Arts in Cologne in 1995.

Directing career
Upon his return to China, Li made his first non-documentary film, the critically acclaimed Blind Shaft (2003). The film's bleak story of two murderous con-men plying their trade in China's dangerous mines proved a major success in the international film festival circuit. Critics particularly noted how Li’s background in documentaries showed through in the film's Cinéma vérité and Italian neorealist style, in particular Li's use of handheld cameras and an ambient sound soundtrack. In China, however, the film’s critical eye toward the notoriously dangerous mining industry proved controversial and Blind Shaft was banned by the Beijing Film Bureau. However, neither the precise reasoning nor the length of the ban was made known to Li.

After his ban, Li Yang split his time between Hong Kong and Germany and gave at least one interview where he claimed,

Despite his worries, the ban was eventually lifted and Li was allowed to begin work on his follow up to Blind Shaft. Entitled Blind Mountain (2007), it debuted at the 2007 Cannes Film Festival in the Prix un certain regard competition and was one of only three Asian films vying for an award at the prestigious event. Like Li's previous film, Blind Mountain turns a sharply critical eye towards another one of China's continuing social problems, this time the illegal selling of women for marriage. Blind Mountain also shares the same realistic style as Blind Shaft as seen in the latter film's cast of mostly non-professional actors and its use of diegetic music.

Awards and nominations
 Berlin International Film Festival, 2003
Silver Bear for Outstanding Artistic Achievement – Blind Shaft (as screenwriter and director)
 Golden Horse Awards, 2003
Best Screenplay Adapted from Another Source – Blind Shaft
 Tribeca Film Festival, 2003
Best Narrative Feature – Blind Shaft
 Edinburgh International Film Festival, 2003
New Director's Award - Blind Shaft
 Hawaii International Film Festival, 2003
Best Film - Blind Shaft
 Hong Kong International Film Festival, 2003
Silver Firebird - Blind Shaft
 International Film Festival Bratislava, 2007
Grand Prix - Blind Mountain
Special Mention of the Ecumenical Jury - Blind Mountain

Filmography

Notes

External links
 
 
 Interview with Li Yang in Le Nouvelle Observateur
 Li Yang at the Chinese Movie Database

Film directors from Shaanxi
Screenwriters from Shaanxi
Artists from Xi'an
1959 births
Living people
Writers from Xi'an
Silver Bear for Best Director recipients